Cristiano da Silva (born 12 January 1987), sometimes known as just Cristiano, is a Brazilian football player for J2 League club V-Varen Nagasaki.

Career
He started playing football with Adap Galo. His first professional team was Coritiba in 2005. After playing for different teams he came to Metropolitano. He was then out on loan for Chapecoense and Juventude. In 2011, he signed a contract with Red Bull Salzburg. On 11 December 2012 it was announced that Cristiano da Silva would be joining Tochigi SC on loan for the 2013 season. In 2014, he joined Ventforet Kofu. On 26 June 2016, Kashiwa Reysol announced they had re-signed Cristiano on a permanent basis to a multi-year contract.

Career statistics
Updated to 2 January 2020.

Honours

Red Bull Salzburg
 Austrian Champion: 2012
 Austrian Cup: 2012

Kashiwa Reysol
 J2 League: 2019

References

External links

Profile at Kashiwa Reysol
Ventforet Kofu 2014

1987 births
Living people
Brazilian footballers
Coritiba Foot Ball Club players
Adap Galo Maringá Football Club players
Rio Claro Futebol Clube players
Associação Chapecoense de Futebol players
Esporte Clube Juventude players
FC Red Bull Salzburg players
J1 League players
J2 League players
Tochigi SC players
Ventforet Kofu players
Kashiwa Reysol players
V-Varen Nagasaki players
Brazilian expatriate footballers
Expatriate footballers in Austria
Expatriate footballers in Japan
Association football forwards
Austrian Football Bundesliga players